Charaxes aubyni is a butterfly in the family Nymphalidae. It is found in Kenya, Tanzania, Malawi and Zambia. 

The habitat consists of montane and semi-montane forests.

The larvae feed on Albizia gummifera, Albizia adianthifolia and Albizia schimperana.

Taxonomy
Charaxes aubyni is a member of the large species group Charaxes etheocles

Subspecies
Charaxes aubyni aubyni (south-eastern Kenya, north-eastern Tanzania)
Charaxes aubyni australis van Someren & Jackson, 1957 (Malawi, southern and south-central Tanzania, Zambia)
Charaxes aubyni ecketti van Someren & Jackson, 1957 (central and south-western Kenya)

References

Victor Gurney Logan Van Someren, 1966 Revisional notes on African Charaxes (Lepidoptera: Nymphalidae). Part III. Bulletin of the British Museum (Natural History) (Entomology)45-101.

External links
African Charaxes/Charaxes Africains Eric Vingerhoedt
Images of C. aubyni aubyni  Royal Museum for Central Africa (Albertine Rift Project)
Images of C. aubyni ecketti  Royal Museum for Central Africa (Albertine Rift Project)
Charaxes aubyni images at Consortium for the Barcode of Life 
Charaxes aubyni aubyni images at BOLD
Charaxes aubyni australis images at BOLD verso
African Butterfly Database Range map via search

Butterflies described in 1952
aubyni